Euphorbia pekinensis, the Peking spurge, is a flowering plant native to Asia.

Medicinal uses
It is one of the 50 fundamental herbs used in traditional Chinese medicine, where it is called dàjǐ.

See also
Chinese herbology 50 fundamental herbs

References

External links
Euphorbia pekinensis (Google Images)

Medicinal plants of Asia
Plants used in traditional Chinese medicine
pekinensis